Rear-Admiral Henry Edward Horan CB DSC (12 August 1890 – 15 August 1961) was an Irish Royal Navy officer who became Commander-in-Chief of the New Zealand Division.

Early life and education

Horan was born in Newcastle West, County Limerick to John Horan, a civil engineer, and Elizabeth Hannah Barker. He was educated at Stubbington House School. He entered Britannia Royal Naval College at Dartmouth in January 1906.

Naval career
Horan entered the Royal Navy in 1910 and served in World War I taking part in the Battle of Heligoland Bight in 1914. He was appointed Commanding Officer of the cruiser HMS Coventry in 1931, Senior Naval Member on the Directing Staff at the Imperial Defence College in October 1935 and Commanding Officer of the battleship HMS Barham in 1937.

He also served in World War II as Commander-in-Chief of the New Zealand Division from December 1939 to April 1940 before retiring in 1941. In early retirement he served as a staff officer in Combined Operations Headquarters in Richmond Terrace, London. He was made a CB in the New Year Honours 1947.

References

1890 births
1961 deaths
Royal Navy admirals of World War II
Companions of the Order of the Bath
Recipients of the Distinguished Service Cross (United Kingdom)
People from Newcastle West
People educated at Stubbington House School